Matthew Neal Stell is an American country music singer, guitarist, and songwriter. His song "Prayed for You" and his EP Everywhere but On were released in 2019.

Early life
Stell was born in Clinton, Arkansas and raised in Center Ridge, Arkansas. He played basketball during high school in the Amateur Athletic Union summer league, and from 2002 to 2006, he played college basketball for Drury University for four years on an athletic scholarship.

After college he worked farming and construction jobs while studying for a master's degree in communications at the University of Arkansas. A medical missions trip to Haiti inspired him to apply to a post-baccalaureate premedical program to complete pre-med coursework not taken as a religion and philosophy major. He applied to Harvard University's Extension School part-time pre-med program, and he was accepted. But in 2014, shortly before the program would have begun, he had the opportunity to sign a publishing deal with Wide Open Music, and he chose music over starting the part-time pre-med program.

Music career
In the late 2000s and early 2010s, Stell played as the lead singer of the band The Crashers. During this time, he released three albums independently: The Sound & the Story, Vestibule Blues, and in March 2013, A River Through It, the latter two of which were on the label 124 Records. He continued playing gigs, and opened for major artists including Luke Bryan and Eric Church. He also wrote for other artists, including Bart Crow, Casey Donahew, and the John D. Hale Band. He moved to Nashville in 2014.

Stell released an EP, Last of the Best, on March 16, 2018. He also released the single, "Prayed For You", which he co-wrote with Allison Veltz and producer Ash Bowers. Rolling Stone named "Prayed For You" one of the "10 Best Country Songs to Hear Now". The song captured the attention of Barry Weiss, former president and CEO of Jive Records, who signed Stell to his label, RECORDS, in July 2018. Keith Gale, president of Good Company Entertainment, signed on to promote the song to radio. Also in 2018, Stell was named a CMT Discovery Artist.

In February 2019, "Prayed For You" reached No. 36 on Billboards Hot Country Songs chart and in March 2019 it reached No. 54 on Billboards Country Airplay chart. The song received over 15 million plays on Spotify and 44 million altogether within just over a year. The official music video for the song starred reality TV star Savannah Chrisley and her fiancé, hockey player Nic Kerdiles. It premiered at People on July 9, 2018 and received over 4.3 million views on YouTube in its first 10 months.

Matt made his Grand Ole Opry debut on April 27, 2019. The same month, Arista Nashville and Sony Music Nashville joined the team working to promote his career. He makes a return appearance at the Grand Ole Opry on June 12, 2019 with Old Crow Medicine Show and the Del McCoury Band. In May, Taste of Country named him an Artist to Watch.
His major label debut EP, the seven-song Everywhere But On, released May 24, 2019 on Records/Arista Nashville, a week after the debut of the music video for the title track. The EP includes a collaboration with Jimmie Allen.

On September 16, 2019, Stell was presented with a RIAA Gold certification for "Prayed for You".

On October 8, 2021, Stell released the song "Boyfriend Season." The song is slated for inclusion alongside the Better Than That EP tracklist on an upcoming album, set to be released in 2022. In 2022, he released the single "Man Made" as well as the promotional single "One of Us".

Discography

Studio albums

Live albums

Extended plays

Singles

References

Living people
American country singer-songwriters
American male singer-songwriters
Singer-songwriters from Arkansas
Country musicians from Arkansas
20th-century American male musicians
Arista Nashville artists
Year of birth missing (living people)